Jane Yardley is an English author, raised in a village in 1960s Essex, (where most of her novels are set). She went to university in London and gained a Ph.D. degree from Charing Cross Hospital Medical School. Although living in London she spends much of her time travelling around the world co-ordinating medical trials for a small Japanese pharmaceutical company, indeed she says that her first novel Painting Ruby Tuesday (2003) was written on aeroplanes.  It concerns ten-year-old Angharad (Annie) Craddock, whose neighbours are being brutally murdered; including Mrs. Clitheroe who shared Annies love of music and her synaesthesia, as Annie puts it "We see things in colour that aren’t. Not just music. Numbers. Letters. Days of the week. People’s names". Jane Yardley herself experiences synaesthesia and it inspired her to write the book.

Her novel Dancing with Dr Kildare was published by Doubleday on 2 January 2008.

Bibliography
Painting Ruby Tuesday (2003)
Rainy Day Women (2004)
A Saucerful of Secrets (2005)
Dancing with Dr Kildare (2008)

References

External links
Interview with The Scotsman 1/2/2003

Year of birth missing (living people)
Living people
English women novelists
Alumni of Imperial College London
21st-century British novelists
People from Essex
21st-century English women writers
Alumni of Charing Cross Medical School